The Women's Young Player of the Year is an annual Úrvalsdeild kvenna honor bestowed on the best young player in the league following every season.

All-time award winners
The following is a list of the all-time Úrvalsdeild Women's Young Player of the Year winners.

References

External links
Icelandic Basketball Federation Official Website 

Úrvalsdeild kvenna (basketball)
European basketball awards